Vampire: The Requiem is a role-playing game published by White Wolf, Inc. for the Chronicles of Darkness setting, and the successor to the Vampire: The Masquerade line. Although it is an entirely new game, rather than a continuation of the previous editions, it uses many elements from the old game including some of the clans and their powers. In the first edition, it required the World of Darkness core rulebook for use, and was released alongside it in August 2004.

In December 2013 the supplement Blood and Smoke: The Strix Chronicle was released, adding a default world setting and significantly revising certain aspects of the game to bring them in line with the upcoming changes to the core rules of the new World of Darkness. At GenCon 2014, it was announced that Blood and Smoke would be re-branded as Vampire: The Requiem, Second Edition, with a new cover, index and very minor changes in November 2014. This release in both its forms was a stand-alone game, able to be played with no other books as references.

History
Vampire: The Requiem was released by White Wolf Publishing on August 21, 2004, as a supplement to the simultaneously released book The World of Darkness, giving players rules for playing as vampires. It became the publisher's flagship title, and was in turn supplemented with its own line of supplements; the line developer was initially Justin Achilli, who was succeeded by Will Hindmarch in November 2004. The first Storytelling Adventure System adventure was Hindmarch's The Resurrectionists (2007) for Vampire: The Requiem. Greg Stolze was working on Vampire: The Requiem when he developed the One-Roll Engine for Godlike (2002). In 2015, the "new" World of Darkness was rebranded as the Chronicles of Darkness by White Wolf Publishing, in an effort to further differentiate the setting from the Classic World of Darkness.

Background 
The game takes place in modern-day earth where vampires form complex societies hidden from human awareness. Vampires are unliving humans created when a vampire drains a human of blood and then feeds the corpse a few drops of their own vampiric blood. Vampires that have inherited common physical powers and qualities group themselves into "clans", but they also join "covenants" along religious, political or philosophical lines. These groups differ radically in purpose and outlook and are often in conflict, though they agree that they must hide their existence from humans.

Vampires generally dwell in large cities, where they can find plenty of prey and easily remain inconspicuous. Vampires do not need to kill humans to steal blood; humans go into a trance when a vampire feeds on them and do not remember the moment, and a vampire can erase the bite marks it made by licking them. While vampires use the stolen blood they call vitae to bolster their physical prowess, heal wounds, and wield Disciplines, it is also the fuel they use to arise every night; a vampire cannot awaken if it does not have any blood.

Clans and covenants 

Similar to the previous game, Kindred are brought into one of five clans as part of their metamorphosis into vampires. Each clan covers a broad range of vampiric archetypes:

 The Daeva evoke the image of vampires as seductive, decadent, sexually transgressive predators who blur lust and hunger together, equating the act of feeding with sensual pleasure, like Joseph Sheridan Le Fanu's Carmilla.
 The Gangrel embody the idea of vampires as predatory feral demons. An upper level in the feeding chain with little or no interest in humans as anything other than food, they represent vampirism as crude predation and evoke ideas of basic instinct, untamed ferocity and freedom that are commonly associated with predators.
 The Mekhet are mysterious conspiratorial occultists, obsessed with knowledge and information, who hide in the shadows and manipulate others from afar.
 Nosferatu vampires are the repulsive, yet fascinating, alien and hideous monsters of legend (such as Count Orlok of their movie namesake).
 Ventrue are regal vampires who value power and dominion to the point of obsession, self-styled "lords of the night" they represent vampirism as a metaphor for maddening power, like Bram Stoker's Dracula.

Within these clans are many sub-clans, known as bloodlines.

There are also many political or religious factions, known as Covenants. These include:

 The Carthian Movement works towards finding the best form of government for the Kindred, basing its experiments on mortal systems like Democracy, Fascism and the like. It is the only Covenant that elects leaders, and is the newest major Covenant.
 The Circle of the Crone is a collection of pagan and Neopagan cults and religions within the vampiric culture. 
 The Invictus (also known as the "First Estate") is an order of vampires that represents the old order of things and act as old nobility, they are also concerned with material gain and power and therefore are heavily involved in city politics and business.
 The Lancea et Sanctum claims the Roman Centurion Longinus as their founder and they believe Kindred (the word vampires use for themselves) have a role in the Divine Providence: that of the ultimate predators, unleashing God's Wrath upon the unworthy and testing the pious.
 The Ordo Dracul is focused on understanding the vampiric condition, improving upon it and ultimately transcending its limitations. 
 The Unaligned is simply a catch-all term for any vampires that do not belong to a covenant.

Powers, abilities and weaknesses 

A vampire's Blood Potency increases steadily with age, but can also be boosted by spending experience points or consuming the soul of another vampire (diablerie). A more potent vampire can store more blood points and access greater supernatural powers. However, his feeding needs become more stringent as well: the weakest vampires can live on animal blood, but the most powerful vampires can only live on the blood of other vampires. Powerful vampires who cannot meet this need usually go into a prolonged slumber either by choice or from hunger; either way, the centuries weaken their blood until they can feed on humans again.

Kindred can use a variety of supernatural powers called Disciplines, reflecting such traits as inhuman speed, strength, or charisma, as well as other vampiric attributes such as control over vermin and predators. These are special abilities associated with their curse which, like their undead bodies, are "fed" in a way by the living blood they take from mortals.

Weaknesses 

Unlike many fictional portrayals, vampires in Requiem are not universally repelled by crucifixes, garlic or holy water, and they can enter any private domain without invitation. A stake through the heart merely paralyses them. Fire, sunlight and the claws and fangs of supernatural creatures inflict terrible injuries that take significant time and blood to heal. During the daytime most vampires slumber; while their bodies will not begin to degrade (unless exposed to the sun or other means of harm) they cannot otherwise be distinguished from corpses.

Vampires all have an aspect of their personality they refer to as "The Beast," which exists only to feed when hungry and kill when upset. When a vampire is sufficiently distraught, either through threat, injury, hunger, or humiliation, they enter a berserk rage called Frenzy during which the Beast takes hold.

Vampires keep the Beast in check with the memories and behaviors of mortal life, collectively referred to as a vampire's Humanity. Without actively working to maintain it, a vampire's humanity will degrade: the need to feed upon humans can drive a vampire to become inured to the cruelty they inflict, and a centuries-long life can leave them jaded to the human experience. In addition to the ever-present threat of losing oneself to the Beast, the Kindred have other motivations to maintain their humanity: vampires with lower humanity are also more grievously harmed by exposure to sunlight, spend longer in the extended slumber called torpor, and their alien perspective makes it more difficult for them to relate to humans.

Antagonists 

Vampires have many enemies, most from within their own clans and covenants. There are some that stand out as being opposed to vampire society as a whole, and some of the most prominent enemies vampires face are vampires themselves. There are only two "enemy only" covenants in the core rulebook:

 Belial's Brood A loose confederation of Satanists, demon-worshippers and overt miscreants. The Covenant claims that the Damned originate from Hell itself, and exalt in the spread of misery and pain. They are intended to be more straightforward enemies, as their goals (spreading wanton misery and violence, heedless of whether they expose the existence of vampires) are antithetical to nearly any character.
 VII A mysterious organization, VII is a faction of vampires dedicated to the destruction of their own species. There is no concrete information given regarding its greater structure, nor any reason given for VII's agenda; the Storyteller is encouraged to create their own.

The second edition also focuses on a different race with vampiric traits that have often clashed with the Kindred:
 Strix Vampires that were never human, the Strix (also known as Owls or Nemeses) are monsters inspired by Roman spirits of the same name, as well as classical, more ghoulish myths of vampires. Strix are living shadows who seek to take over physical bodies so they may experience physical sensation. They are completely amoral beings who despise the very concept of humanity, to the point where even draugr, insane vampires who have lost their Humanity completely, are usually too much like the living for their liking.

Books 

 Vampire: The Requiem (August 2004)
 Coteries (October 2004)
 Nomads (November 2004)
 Rites of the Dragon (November 2004)
 Bloodlines: The Hidden (February 2005)
 Lancea Sanctum (March 2005)
 City of the Damned: New Orleans (May 2005)
 Ghouls (May 2005)
 Ordo Dracul (July 2005)
 VII (August 2005)
 The Invictus (October 2005)
 Bloodlines: The Legendary (January 2006)
 Requiem Chronicler's Guide (February 2006)
 Carthians (April 2006)
 Mythologies (June 2006)
 Circle of the Crone (August 2006)
 Belial's Brood (January 2007)
 The Resurrectionists (PDF only) (January 2007)
 The Blood (May 2007)
 Bloodlines: The Chosen (July 2007)
 Damnation City (August 2007)
 Requiem for Rome (October 2007)
 Fall of The Camarilla (January 2008)
 Criminal Intent (PDF only) (January 2008)
 Scenes of Frenzy (PDF only) (January 2008)
 Blood Red + Ash Gray (PDF only) (January 2008)
 The Resurrectionists (PDF only) (January 2008)
 Lords Over the Damned: Ventrue (April 2008)
 Kiss of the Succubus: Daeva (May 2008)
 Savage and Macabre: Gangrel (September 2008)
 Shadows in the Dark: Mekhet (January 2009)
 New Wave Requiem (PDF & Print on Demand) (February 2009)
 Night Horrors: Immortal Sinners (February 2009)
 The Beast that Haunts the Blood: Nosferatu (March 2009)
 Ancient Mysteries (April 2009)
 Ancient Bloodlines (May 2009)
 Ready-Made Player Characters: The Slaughterhouse V (June 2009)
 The Testament of Longinus (June 2009)
 Night Horrors: The Wicked Dead (September 2009)
 Paterfamilias (PDF only) (February 2010)
 Invite Only (July 2010)
 The Hungry Streets (PDF only) (August 2010)
 Scenes of the Embrace (PDF only) (January 2011)
 The Danse Macabre (March 2011)
 Into the Void (PDF only) (May 2011)
 Strange Dead Love (PDF & Print on Demand) (December 2011)
 Blood Sorcery: Sacraments & Blasphemies (PDF & Print on Demand) (September 2012)
 Vampire: The Requiem Second Edition (originally published as Blood and Smoke: The Strix Chronicle) (PDF & Print on Demand) (December 16, 2013)
 Secrets of the Covenants (PDF & Print on Demand) (February 2017)
 Thousand Years of Night (PDF & Print on Demand) (June 2017)
 Half-Damned (PDF & Print on Demand) (November 2017)
 Guide to the Night (PDF & Print on Demand) (October 2018)
 Night Horrors: Spilled Blood (PDF & Print on Demand) (February 2020)

Reception
Vampire: The Requiem was met with critical acclaim.

Vampire: The Requiem won the 2005 Gold Ennie Award for "Best Supplement" and the Silver Ennie Award for "Best Interior Art".

Reviews
Pyramid

Other media 
New Line Cinema optioned the feature rights to Vampire: The Requiem in 2004, but to date no script has emerged.

White Wolf released two board games for the Vampire: The Requiem setting: Prince of the City was released in October 2004, and Dark Influences was released in October 2006.

An original Vampire: The Requiem book trilogy was released in 2004, written by Greg Stolze and Lucien Soulban. In 2004, White Wolf conducted a novel writing competition, shortly before canceling their fiction line in 2005. One of the winners, The Silent Knife by David Nurenberg, was eventually published in December 2012.

Notes

References

External links 
 

Chronicles of Darkness
ENnies winners
Role-playing games introduced in 2004